Arctic Islands may refer to:

 Canadian Arctic islands
 Islands in the Arctic, see :Category:Islands of the Arctic Ocean
 Russian Arctic islands